Diplomatic Immunity is a New Zealand sitcom that follows the misadventures at the consulate of The Most Royal Kingdom of Fe'ausi and a fallen New Zealand Foreign Affairs high-flier who has been sent in to straighten out the consulate staff.  The show screened in New Zealand on TV One, every Tuesday night at 10:00.

Synopsis 
After a public disgrace, Leighton Mills (Craig Parker) is sent to the Royal Consulate of Fe'ausi. He must stop the dodgy dealings of its staff and all the silly behaviour around the office including illegal weddings and April Fool's Day jokes taken too far, and try to encourage the immature ambassador Jonah Fa'auigaese (David Fane) to do the right thing.  Meanwhile, he is attracted to Jonah's daughter, Leilani (Lesley-Ann Brandt), and attempts to avoid the rest of the consulate staff.

Cast and characters

Main 
 David Fane as Jonah Fa'auigaese: Jonah is the Fe'ausi ambassador to New Zealand and brother of King Gideon, the reigning monarch. A Machiavellian master politician who can go from great eloquence to feigned fresh-off-the-boat-ness with consummate skill, he truly believes that all the dodgy deals and morally questionable decisions he makes are for the good of his people.
 Craig Parker as Leighton Mills: Leighton is the fallen rising star of New Zealand Foreign Affairs. Ambitious and urbane, Leighton was an aspiring diplomat. An unfortunate incident involving alcohol; the randy daughter of a minor British Royal; the backseat of the Queen's limo and the paparazzi, saw his fledgling career nipped in the bud. Leighton has been shipped north from Wellington to Auckland, as a diplomatic attaché, attached to the consulate of The Most Royal Kingdom of Fe'ausi.
 Lesley-Ann Brandt as Leilani Fa'auigaese: Leilani is an intelligent, outspoken woman. But lately she has become a problem. Leilani has led the men of Fe'ausi on, while forcing them to listen to political ideas. Her popularity with men has made her extremely unpopular with the women. Thus Leilani has been deported to New Zealand, to be with her father; Jonah, who just wants to hide her away because she is severely endangering his chance to land the job of King. She has a phobia of whales.
 John Leigh as Mick Fa'auigaese: Mick is a funny wee guy with a mysterious past and an even more mysterious present. With no morals to speak of, he's like a human cockroach, scurrying from one deal to the next and trying at all costs, to avoid the light. Mick is the albino adopted second cousin of the king.
 Mario Gaoa as Malepe Fa'auigaese:  Malepe is the son of a cousin of the King. He specialises in hanging out and looking cool - and getting parking tickets outside strip clubs, of course.
 Kayte Ferguson as Suga Fa'auigaese: Suga is the niece of a cousin of the King. She has come to New Zealand to marry a rich white man, and to have many babies. Suga is officially, the consulate Tourist Affairs liaison.
 Hannah Marshall as Kirsty: Kirsty is the effervescent, irreplaceable heart and soul of the embassy. She questions nothing and does everything that is asked of her. Kirsty is pretty much the only one who does any legitimate work round the consulate. She also knows everything that is going on and is quite happy to use her knowledge to stir things up a bit.

Guest 
 Natalie Medlock as Princess Grace: The French princess whom Leighton was caught with, which got him sent to the consulate. She marries Mick.
 Jason Hoyte and Johnathan Brugh as Brother Jacob and Brother John: Two brothers who want to marry desperately. They find it okay to marry more than one woman. They have a habit of asking Kirsty to marry them.
 Robbie Magasiva as Prince To'omai: Prince To'omai is the prince of the country of Fa'akofa. He is very handsome, but extremely stupid. He was to marry Leilani, but Leighton hides the key to the room where the traditional shagashaga is to be held, so the wedding was called off. To'omai likes many wives, who are blonde.
 Pua Magasiva as The Niu: The Niu is the carrier of the diplomatic pouch. He is an avid surfer and all the women in the consulate are attracted to him. His stupidity leads him to pick up a dangerous spider and bring it to the consulate. Leighton finds out he is gay.
 Paul Barrett as Lewis Moorecock: A gay financial advisor whom the consulate adores. He writes them a musical about Sir Edmund Hillary.
 Sarah Owen as Janice: A whale protestor who chains herself to the consulates fence. She has a vast knowledge of all whales. She also protests seal beatings.
 Michelle Langstone as Svetlana: a woman Jonah falls for.
 Madeleine Sami as Agent Amy Bickler: A secret agent who suspects Leilani of being a terrorist. She is slightly loopy and pretends to be Leighton's girlfriend in case people are secretly watching them.

Episodes

References

External links
 
 
  at TVNZ
  at South Pacific Pictures

2009 New Zealand television series debuts
2009 New Zealand television series endings
New Zealand television sitcoms
TVNZ 1 original programming
Television shows funded by NZ on Air
Television series by South Pacific Pictures
Television series by All3Media